Ervin Starhemberg Acel (December 18, 1888 – February 24, 1958) was a Hungarian-born American fencer. He competed in the team sabre event at the 1928 Summer Olympics.

Abel was born in Hungary and gained his PhD in law from the University of Berlin before moving to the US. After his sporting career, he became an authority on migrant worker law, wrote articles on Eastern European politics for The New York Times, and worked as a secretary for the Amateur Fencers League of America.

References

External links
 

1888 births
1958 deaths
American male sabre fencers
Austro-Hungarian emigrants to the United States
People from the Kingdom of Hungary
Olympic fencers of the United States
Fencers at the 1928 Summer Olympics
People from Kisvárda